In Canadian politics, a Pink Tory is a pejorative term for a liberal member of one of the Conservative or Progressive Conservative parties, more liberal than a Red Tory. The term was often derisively applied to the 1971 to 1985 Ontario Progressive Conservative government of Bill Davis by critics on the right, particularly Toronto Sun columnist Claire Hoy.. The term was used positively by Ron Dart to describe the political philosophy of Robert Stanfield in the 1968 election as a "sort of pink toryism". In 2002, Jim Flaherty described rival leadership contender Ernie Eves as a "pink" Tory. More recently the term has been used to describe socially progressive Conservatives who support same-sex marriage and are pro-choice.

References

See also
 Blue Tory
 Red Tory
 High Tory
 Libertarian
 Limousine liberal
 Republican in Name Only

Toryism
Conservatism in Canada